Angel Face is a 1953 American film noir directed by Otto Preminger, starring Robert Mitchum and Jean Simmons, and featuring Leon Ames and Barbara O'Neil. It was filmed on location in Beverly Hills, California.

Plot 

Frank Jessup is an ambulance driver who dreams of running his own repair shop for sportscars. One evening, while responding to an emergency call, he meets beautiful heiress Diane Tremayne. Frank soon alienates his girlfriend, Mary Wilton. When the Tremayne family offers Frank a job as a chauffeur, with his own rooms on the estate, he accepts.

One afternoon, as Diane's father and stepmother start their car to drive to town, their vehicle mysteriously reverses when geared to drive forward. It careens backwards down a steep cliff, killing both occupants. As Diane is the sole heir to their fortune, she comes under suspicion for murder. Frank is also suspected of having tampered with the vehicle's transmission. Fred Barrett, their defense attorney, persuades them to marry to curry the jury's favor.

The district attorney has no real concrete evidence, and they are found not guilty. Afterward, Frank tells Diane that he is ending their sham marriage. He tries to make up with Mary, but she wants nothing to do with him. Diane, overcome with a sense of guilt, goes to Barrett and tells him she wishes to have her statement written down and witnessed; she states that she and she alone committed the murders. However, Barrett informs her that she cannot be tried again, due to double jeopardy. When Frank returns to the Tremayne estate to get his belongings. He has called for a taxi, but Diane offers to drive him to the station. He accepts. After putting the car in gear, Diane accelerates backwards, crashing down the cliff.

Cast 
 Robert Mitchum as Frank Jessup
 Jean Simmons as Diane Tremayne
 Mona Freeman as Mary Wilton
 Herbert Marshall  as Charles Tremayne, Diane's father
 Leon Ames as Fred Barrett, Frank and Diane's defense attorney
 Barbara O'Neil as Catherine Tremayne, Diane's stepmother
 Kenneth Tobey as Bill, Frank's fellow ambulance driver
 Raymond Greenleaf as Arthur Vance, Catherine Tremayne's estate attorney
 Griff Barnett as the judge
 Robert Gist as Miller, the forensic expert on automobile mechanics
 Morgan Farley as a juror who asks two questions during the trial
 Jim Backus as Judson, the district attorney prosecuting Frank and Diane
 Frank Kumagai as Ito, the Tremaynes' butler

Production 

Turner Classic Movies host Eddie Muller reported that RKO studio boss Howard Hughes hired director Otto Preminger expressly for the purpose of torturing Jean Simmons because she did not intend to renew her contract with RKO. However, according to Simmons' husband Stewart Granger, "she enjoyed [making] the film. She adored Mitchum and used to tell me what a good actor he was." Robert Mitchum was also reputed to have had a difficult working relationship with Preminger on the set.

Production began on June 18, 1952, with a budget of under $1,000,000 and a production schedule of just 18 days because of cinematographer Harry Stradling's reputation for quick work. Principal photography ended in mid-July 1952, and editing and post-production were completed by the end of September. Previews were held in early December 1952, with notices appearing throughout the month in Box Office, The Film Daily, The Hollywood Reporter, Motion Picture Herald and Variety.

The film was released on February 11, 1953.

Reception 

In a contemporary review for The New York Times, critic Howard Thompson called Angel Face "an exasperating blend of  genuine talent, occasional perceptiveness and turgid psychological claptrap" and wrote: "[A] nice, taut story idea have been set adrift in a pretentious Freudian mist that wafts through the handsomely mounted proceedings with disastrous results. ... [A] peculiar, off-hand surrender to fuzzy character motivations, deliberately confusing incidents and a meandering pace upset this quality apple cart. And the absurdly dismal finale seems a perfect crowning touch for all that proceeds it."

Dave Kehr from the Chicago Reader wrote in 1985: "This intense Freudian melodrama by Otto Preminger (1953) is one of the forgotten masterworks of film noir... The film is a disturbingly cool, rational investigation of the terrors of sexuality...The sets, characters, and actions are extremely stylized, yet Preminger's moving camera gives them a frightening unity and fluidity, tracing a straight, clean line to a cliff top for one of the most audacious endings in film history." Film noir historian Alain Silver wrote: "In Otto Preminger’s work sexuality may be either therapeutic or destructive. Angel Face epitomizes the latter quality.... Preminger does not suggest that Frank is a hapless victim. Rather his mise-en-scène, which repeatedly frames the figures in obliquely angled medium shots against the depth of field created by the expensive furnishings of the Tremayne mansion, and Mitchum’s subdued portrayal engender an atmosphere of fatality."

Shortly before his death, critic Robin Wood named Angel Face as one of his top 10 films.

In 1963, Jean-Luc Godard listed Angel Face as the eighth-best American sound film.

References

External links 

 
 
 
 
 Angel Face at TV Guide (1987 write-up was originally published in The Motion Picture Guide)
 

1953 crime drama films
1953 films
American crime drama films
American black-and-white films
Film noir
Films set in Los Angeles
RKO Pictures films
Films directed by Otto Preminger
Films scored by Dimitri Tiomkin
Films shot in Beverly Hills, California
1950s English-language films
1950s American films